Sangam-dong is a legal dong (neighborhood) of the Mapo District in Seoul, South Korea. In the wake of the 2002 FIFA World Cup, a large apartment complex and DMC business district have been created and developed into the center of western Seoul.

Attractions
Nanjido (난지도 蘭芝島)
World Cup Park (월드컵공원)
Millennium Park (밀레니엄공원)
Sky Park (하늘공원)
Pyeonghwa Park (평화공원 平和公園)
Noeul Park (노을공원)
Nanjicheon Park (난지천공원)
Hangang Citizens' Nanji Park (한강시민난지공원)
Korean Film Archive (한국영상자료원)
Jodin Leeso Korean Film Museum (한국 영화 박물관)
Cinematheque KOFA (시네마테크 KOFA)
Korean Film Referential Library (영상 자료실)
 CJ E&M Center (씨제이 이앤엠 센터) (broadcast and recording studio of many Mnet programs  with a studio audience such as the live weekly music show M! Countdown)
Munhwa Broadcasting Corporation(MBC) (문화방송)

Education
Schools located in Sangam-dong:
 Japanese School in Seoul
 Sangam Elementary School
 Sangji Elementary School
 Seoul Haneul Elementary School
 Sangam Middle School
 Sangam High School

See also 
Administrative divisions of South Korea

References

External links
 Mapo-gu official website in English
 Map of Mapo-gu at the Mapo-gu official website
 Sky Park at Official Seoul City Tourism
 Map of Mapo-gu at the Mapo-gu official website
 Sangam-dong resident office website
 Sangam-dong map

Neighbourhoods of Mapo District